Hercule et Sherlock is a 1996 French comedy film directed by Jeannot Szwarc and starring Christopher Lambert. This marks his first venture away from action films and B-movies and into family-friendly comedy.

Plot
When a counterfeiter is captured, two of his thugs have to work with two counterfeit money-sniffing dogs named Hercule and Sherlock in order to find the lost cash.

Cast
 Christopher Lambert as Vincent
 Richard Anconina as Bruno
 Philippine Leroy-Beaulieu as Marie
 Roland Blanche as Antoine Morand
 Béatrice Agenin as Nicole Morand
 Élise Tielrooy as Pauline
 Laurent Gendron as Daniel

Reception
Isabelle Danel from Télérama was not very enthusiastic about the film, stating that only dogs and people below 12 years would find the film interesting.

References

External links

French comedy films
1996 films
Films directed by Jeannot Szwarc
Films scored by Gabriel Yared
Films about dogs
Counterfeit money in film
1990s French-language films
1990s French films